Ocón is a municipality of the autonomous community of La Rioja (Spain).  Its population in January 2006 was 322 inhabitants over a 34.3 square kilometer area.  It is formed by the villages La Villa, Pipaona, Aldealobos, Las Ruedas, Santa Lucía and Los Molinos.

Municipalities in La Rioja (Spain)